Walter Leland Rutherford "Lee" Clark (16 December 1936 – 10 August 2008) was a Progressive Conservative party member of the House of Commons of Canada. He was born in Davidson, Saskatchewan and was a professor by career.

Clark attended the University of Saskatchewan. There, he met and, in 1959, married Barbara Woods. Clark went on to study at the University of Oregon and, after teaching in Regina, Saskatchewan and Brandon, Manitoba, received his PhD in Canadian history from the University of Alberta.

Following the November 1982 death of Brandon—Souris Member of Parliament Walter Dinsdale, Clark became the Progressive Conservative party candidate for the riding in a by-election in May 1983. Clark won the seat and was re-elected in the 1984 and 1988 federal elections.

Clark left federal politics and did not campaign in the 1993 federal election after serving for part of the 32nd Canadian Parliament, and for full terms in the 33rd and 34th Parliaments.

Clark died at the age of 71, following a fall from a horse at Lake Metigoshe.

Electoral history

References

External links
 

1936 births
2008 deaths
Members of the House of Commons of Canada from Manitoba
Progressive Conservative Party of Canada MPs
People from Davidson, Saskatchewan